Charles Benjamin Bright McLaren, 1st Baron Aberconway,  (12 May 1850 – 23 January 1934), known as Sir Charles McLaren, 1st Baronet, between 1902 and 1911, was a Scottish jurist and Liberal Party politician. He was a landowner and industrialist.

Early life and education
Born in Edinburgh, McLaren was the son of the politician Duncan McLaren and Priscilla Bright. Priscilla was McLaren's third wife, and was the daughter of Jacob Bright and the sister of the Liberal statesman John Bright and temperance activist Margaret Bright Lucas. His full siblings included the Liberal MP Walter McLaren and the philanthropist Helen Priscilla McLaren, wife of Italian dietitian Andrea Rabagliati. Among McLaren's half-siblings were the judge John McLaren from his father's first marriage and the doctor Agnes McLaren from his father's second marriage.

McLaren was educated at Grove House School and then studied at the University of Heidelberg as well as the University of Bonn. He finally graduated from the University of Edinburgh first class honours with a Master of Arts.

Political career

McLaren began his career in journalism, but turned to the law and in 1874, he was admitted to Lincoln's Inn as a barrister. In 1880, he was elected to the House of Commons as Member of Parliament (MP) for Stafford; he served that constituency until 1886. In 1892, he returned to the Commons as MP for Bosworth, which he represented until 1910.

McLaren's political career advanced during his second term, and in 1897 he was appointed a Queen's Counsel. It was announced that he would receive a baronetcy in the 1902 Coronation Honours list published on 26 June 1902 for the (subsequently postponed) coronation of King Edward VII, and on 24 July 1902 he was created a Baronet, of Bodnant, in the County of Denbigh. He was sworn of the Privy Council in 1908, and held the office of Justice of the Peace in Middlesex, Flint, Denbighshire, and Surrey. In 1911, a year after he had left the Commons (his son replaced him), he was raised to the Peerage of the United Kingdom with the title Baron Aberconway, of Bodnant, in the County of Denbigh.

McLaren was decorated with the 3rd class of the Japanese Order of the Sacred Treasure and received the Serbian Order of the Cross of Takovo. He was awarded a Commander of the Greek Order of the Redeemer.

Career in industry
His father-in-law, a noted industrialist, died in 1895, and McLaren became increasingly involved in the management of the companies inherited from him. He would become chairman of the Tredegar Iron and Coal Company and the British Iron Trade Association. McLaren chaired also the London-based Metropolitan Railway Company and the shipbuilding firm John Brown & Company.

Family
On 6 March 1877, McLaren married Laura, the daughter of the chemist Henry Davis Pochin and suffragist Agnes Heap, in Westminster; the couple had four children. He and his wife were neighbours and friends of James McNeill Whistler, owning several of his works.

Laura died in 1933 and McLaren survived her until the following year. They are buried at a mausoleum called "The Poem" within Bodnant Garden, which became the traditional burial place of the Lords Aberconway. On his death in 1934, in Belgrave Square in London, the barony and baronetcy passed to his eldest son, Henry. His second son Francis sat also in the Parliament of the United Kingdom, however was killed during the First World War in his father's lifetime. The older daughter Priscilla was a socialite as well as activist and married the journalist Sir Henry Norman, 1st Baronet. Her younger sister Elsie was the wife of Sir Edward Johnson-Ferguson, 2nd Baronet.

References

Sources
 
 
 thePeerage.com

External links
 
 

1850 births
1934 deaths
1
British King's Counsel
Liberal Party (UK) MPs for English constituencies
Members of Lincoln's Inn
Members of the Privy Council of the United Kingdom
Scottish justices of the peace
 
McLaren, Charles
McLaren, Charles
McLaren, Charles
McLaren, Charles
McLaren, Charles
McLaren, Charles
McLaren, Charles
UK MPs who were granted peerages
Charles
Alumni of the University of Edinburgh
Heidelberg University alumni
University of Bonn alumni
British expatriates in Germany
Members of the Parliament of the United Kingdom for Stafford
Barons created by George V